List of Registered Historic Places in West Warwick, Rhode Island, which has been transferred from and is an integral part of National Register of Historic Places listings in Kent County, Rhode Island

Current listings

|}

Former listings

|}

See also

National Register of Historic Places listings in Kent County, Rhode Island
List of National Historic Landmarks in Rhode Island

References

N
.
.West Warwick
West Warwick
West Warwick